The Argentine Condor missile was a multinational space research program started in the 1970s. It involved significant contract work being performed by German company MBB (now a group within Daimler AG), but later developed into a ballistic missiles program.

Condor I
The original Condor had little military capability but helped build expertise later used for the Alacrán missile program. The Alacrán program developed a functional short-range ballistic missile.

Specifications (Condor I) 
 Length: 
 Maximum diameter: 
 Stages: 1
 Fuel: HTPB
 Guidance system: inertial
 Apogee: 
 Range: 
 Payload:

Alacrán (Condor IAIII) 

The Alacrán missile was a short range ballistic missile derived from the Condor Missile Program.

Derived from the Condor IAIII prototype, the Alacrán missile had shorter stabilization fins, an inertial guidance system, and a 1000CAP1 cluster warhead.

Specifications (Condor IAIII - Alacrán) 
 Length: 
 Maximum diameter: 
 Stages: 1
 Fuel: HTPB
 Guidance system: inertial
 Apogee: 
 Range: 
 Warhead: 1000CAM1 cluster munition warhead,

Condor II

During and after the 1982 Falklands War, France (which supplied missiles) placed an arms embargo on Argentina, causing the Argentine Air Force, under the command of Ernesto Crespo, to develop its own medium-range missile in the Condor II program.

This program was undertaken in close collaboration with Egypt, and then Iraq (the Iraqi version was called BADR-2000), however it was discontinued in the early 1990s by President Carlos Menem because of political pressure from the United States. The missile was developed in Falda del Carmen, Córdoba Province.

The Condor missile had a range of 800 km to 1,000 km and a 1000CAP1 500 kg cluster munition warhead.

In 1997, the Argentine Air Force reported to the US Congress that it still possessed two of the missiles that were to be destroyed.

Condor III
There have been reports of a Condor III program.

See also
Argentina and weapons of mass destruction

References

External links
 Condor 1-AIII

Sounding rockets of Argentina
Space programme of Argentina
Short-range ballistic missiles
Guided missiles of Argentina
Abandoned military projects of Argentina
Cancelled spacecraft
Argentina–Germany relations
Argentina–Egypt relations